Tuchkovo is a rural locality (a selo) in Volosatovskoye Rural Settlement, Selivanovsky District, Vladimir Oblast, Russia. The population was 9 as of 2010.

Geography 
Tuchkovo is located on the Kolp River, 11 km northwest from Krasnaya Gorbatka (the district's administrative centre) by road. Krasnaya Gorbatka is the nearest rural locality.

References 

Rural localities in Selivanovsky District
Sudogodsky Uyezd